Raelene Sharp (born 1957 in Melbourne) is an Australian artist who won the Packing Room award at the Archibald Prize in 2012 with her portrait of actor John Wood titled A Strength of Character. She has also been a finalist five times in the Shirley Hannan Portrait Prize and won in 2006 with her self-portrait titled A Woman’s Lot. She has been a finalist in the Black Swan Portrait Prize three times and the James Farrell Self Portrait Prize. Her commissions have included Michael Robertson AO, Professor Fred Mendelsohn, Dr Deborah Siefert and Professor Ruth Bishop AO.

References

External links 

Raelene Sharp on Portrait Artists Australia

1957 births
Living people
Australian women painters
Archibald Prize Packing Room Prize winners
20th-century Australian women artists
20th-century Australian artists
21st-century Australian women artists
21st-century Australian artists